The PR3 mixed coxed four competition at the 2017 World Rowing Championships in Sarasota took place in Nathan Benderson Park.

Schedule
The schedule was as follows:

All times are Eastern Daylight Time (UTC-4)

Results

Exhibition race
With fewer than seven entries in this event, boats contested a race for lanes before the final.

Final
The final determined the rankings.

References

2017 World Rowing Championships